XIV Corps was a British infantry corps during the First World War. During the Second World War the identity was recreated for deceptive purposes.

First World War
XIV Corps was formed in France on 3 January 1916 under Lieutenant-General the Earl of Cavan. It took part in the Battle of the Somme in 1916; a year later it fought through the Battle of Passchendaele before being redeployed to Italy in November 1917.

Subordinate units

1918 (Italy)
 Corps headquarters & supporting troops.
 British 7th Infantry Division
 British 23rd Infantry Division
 British 48th Infantry Division

General Officers Commanding
Commanders included:
 11 January – 11 August 1916: Lieutenant-General the Earl of Cavan
 11 August – 17 August 1916: Lieutenant-General Edward Fanshawe (temporary)
 17 August – 10 September 1916: Lieutenant-General Sir Thomas Morland (temporary)
 10 September 1916 – 10 March 1918: Lieutenant-General the Earl of Cavan
 15 October 1918 – 1919 Lieutenant-General Sir James Babington

Second World War

In the Second World War, the XIV corps was notionally reformed in North Africa in late 1943 as part the cover plan for the Anzio landings. Initially assigned to the British Twelfth Army, the corps was later depicted as being under the command of the United States Seventh Army and finally under the 15th Army Group as the theater reserve for the Italian campaign

Insignia

The corps insignia in World War II was that of a black wolf's head, with a lolling red tongue superimposed on a white square.

Subordinate units

As with its original parent formation the "Twelfth Army", the units notionally under command of the "XIV Corps"  varied depending on the nature of the threat being depicted.

1943 (Operation Oakfield)
 Corps headquarters & supporting troops.
 British 40th Infantry Division (fictional)
 British 42nd Division (fictional)
 British 57th Infantry Division (fictional)

1944 (Operation Zeppelin)
 Corps headquarters & supporting troops.
 British 5th Airborne Division (fictional)
 British 40th Infantry Division (fictional)
 British 42nd Division (fictional)
 British 57th Infantry Division (fictional)

1945 (15th Army Group reserve)
 Corps headquarters & supporting troops.
 British 42nd Division (fictional)
 British 57th Infantry Division (fictional)

References

Bibliography
 
 Heathcote, T.A. (1999). The British Field Marshals 1736–1997. Pen & Sword Books Ltd. 
 Holt, T (2005). The Deceivers: Allied Military Deception in the Second World War. Phoenix. 

British field corps
Corps of the British Army in World War I
Italian front (World War I)
Fictional units of World War II